Kamaka (previously known as Mito) is an island in the Gambier Islands of French Polynesia, 11.7 km south of Mangareva within the same lagoon. There are no permanent springs on the island.

 to the NNW rises barren and rugged Makaroa island and off Kamaka's northeastern shore lies the small Manui islet.

The island was not permanently inhabited before European contact, with occupation being short-term and focused on fishing. It is now uninhabited.

In 2015 a conservation campaign was unsuccessful in eradicating rats from the island.

References

Islands of the Gambier Islands
Uninhabited islands of French Polynesia